Matthew Steele (19 February 1878 – 12 December 1937) was a Scottish architect, who worked principally in his hometown of Bo'ness and the surrounding area. He was an architectural designer in the Arts and Crafts and Art Deco design movements and designed The Hippodrome Cinema, thought to be the oldest such building surviving in Scotland. He died in Bo'ness from pneumonia in 1937.

Selected works

Further reading

External links 
Falkirk Community Trust: History of the Hippodrome

Scottish architects
1878 births
1937 deaths